35 Boys 5 Concepts is an EP by contestants of the South Korean survival show Produce 101 Season 2. It was released online for download on June 3, 2017, by CJ E&M.

Background
Produce 101 Season 2 was a South Korean survival show that aired on Mnet from April to June in 2017 where 101 male trainees from various entertainment companies competed to debut in an 11-member boy group which would promote until December 2018.

On the 8th and 9th episode, the 35 remaining trainees were split into five teams and given five new songs from different producers, with different genres. They were tasked to perform these songs live in front of total audience of 2000. The nu-disco song "Show Time" was produced by Veethoven, Oh Sung Hwan, ASHTRAY and Kingmaker. The synth pop/funk song "I Know You Know" was produced by Jeff Lewis, nomad, MRey, and Hyuk Shin who has worked with many major artists in K-pop industry, including Exo, Shinee, f(x), Girls' Generation and Teen Top. The Future EDM song "열어줘 (Open Up)" was produced by Devine Channel who has composed BTS's Fire and VIXX's Shangri-La. The hip hop song "Oh Little Girl" was produced by ASSBRASS and Phantom's Kiggen from Brand New Music, and the deep house song "Never" was produced by Cube Entertainment's PENTAGON and Triple H.

Track listing

Commercial reception
On June 3, 2017, "Never" by Nation's Sons achieved an all-kill on Instiz, charting at #1 on real-time charts of Melon, Mnet, Bugs, Soribada, and Naver.

Notes

References

2017 compilation albums
K-pop albums
Korean-language compilation albums
Produce 101
Albums produced by Hui (singer)